Terje Johansen  (born 31 August 1941) is a Norwegian politician.

He was born in Trondheim to Johan L. Johansen and Åse Berg. He was elected representative to the Storting for the period 1997–2001 for the Liberal Party.

References

1941 births
Living people
Politicians from Trondheim
Liberal Party (Norway) politicians
Members of the Storting